Shin Soon-ho (born 8 November 1959) is a South Korean former tennis player.

Shin won three gold medals for South Korea at the 1982 Asian Games in New Delhi, which came in the women's doubles, mixed doubles and team event. 

She also represented South Korea in Federation Cup tennis, in both 1982 and 1983, for a total of eight ties. In 2007 she served as South Korea's Fed Cup captain.

References

External links
 
 

1959 births
Living people
South Korean female tennis players
Asian Games gold medalists for South Korea
Asian Games bronze medalists for South Korea
Asian Games medalists in tennis
Medalists at the 1982 Asian Games
Medalists at the 1986 Asian Games
Tennis players at the 1982 Asian Games
Tennis players at the 1986 Asian Games
20th-century South Korean women